The New Zealand Warriors 2012 season is the New Zealand Warriors 18th first-grade season. The club is competing in Australasia's National Rugby League. The coach of the team was Brian McClennan, until he was sacked on 21 August after Round 22, while Simon Mannering is the club's captain. Assistant Coach Tony Iro was appointed caretaker coach for the final two matches.

Milestones
4 February – All Stars Match: Manu Vatuvei represents the NRL All Stars in the pre-season All Stars Match.
5 March – Round One: Ben Henry and Konrad Hurrell make their first grade debuts while Nathan Friend plays his first match for the Warriors.
24 March – Round Four: Simon Mannering played in his 150th NRL match and his 50th match as captain.
12 May – Round 10: Ukuma Ta'ai played in his 50th NRL match.
16 June – Round 15: Omar Slaimankhel made his first grade debut.
16 June – Round 15: Ben Matulino played in his 100th NRL match. He became the first player from the Toyota Cup to play 100 matches in the National Rugby League.
11 August – Round 23: Manu Vatuvei becomes the first player to score 100 tries for the club.
11 August – Round 23: Bill Tupou played in his 50th NRL match.
19 August – Round 24: Manu Vatuvei played in his 150th NRL match.
19 August – Round 24: Feleti Mateo played in his 50th match for the club.
2 September – Round 26: In Micheal Luck's last NRL match, the Warriors lost their eight straight match, a record for the club. The streak included two back-to-back losses involving comebacks of eighteen points or more, an NRL first.

Jersey and sponsors

Change of ownership
On 2 March owner Eric Watson announced that he had bought out the minority shareholders, including Mark Hotchin, and would form a new 50–50 venture with Owen Glenn to control the club.

Fixtures

The Warriors opened the season by hosting a match at Eden Park in Auckland. This was only the second time that the Warriors have played a home match away from Mount Smart Stadium. The remaining 11 home games will be played at Mount Smart Stadium, their only home ground since they entered the competition in 1995.

Pre-season training
The main squad returned to training on 21 November 2011 to start preparing for the 2012 season. Players involved in the 2011 Four Nations and other representative matches returned to training later. Twenty three first graders were present on the first day of training.

Pre-season matches
North Harbour Stadium hosted a Warriors trial match for the tenth time. The Warriors also played a match in Whangarei.

Regular season

Ladder

Squad

The Warriors used twenty nine players during the season. Seven players made their debut for the club, including six who were making their NRL debuts – all of these players were graduates from the Warriors Toyota Cup programme.

Staff
Chief Executive Officer: Wayne Scurrah
General Manager: Don Mann Jr
Recruitment and Development Manager: Dean Bell
High Performance Manager: Craig Walker
High Performance Assistant: Ruben Wiki
Medical Services Manager: John Mayhew
Welfare and Education Manager: Jerry Seuseu
Media and Communications Manager: Richard Becht

NRL staff
NRL Head Coach: Brian McClennan, until 21 August 2012, replaced by Tony Iro.
NRL Assistant Coach: Tony Iro
Defence coach: Ruben Wiki
Halves Coach: Andrew Johns

NYC staff
NYC Head Coach & Assistant NRL Coach: John Ackland
Development Coach: Willie Swann

Transfers

Gains

Losses

Mid-season Losses

Other teams
In 2012 the Junior Warriors are again competing in the Toyota Cup while senior players who are not required for the first team play with the Auckland Vulcans in the NSW Cup. The Vulcans are coached by former Warriors development coach Ricky Henry.

Toyota Cup squad

Vulcans squad
The Auckland Vulcans contracted ten players. The team was strengthened with Warriors players not picked for each round and local club players. The ten contracted players were: DJ Collier, Agnatius Paasi, Daniel Palavi, Tulson Caird, Willie Peace, James Blackwell, Ruben Williams, Steve Waetford, Darin Kingi and Murray Iti.

Sam Lousi was named the Auckland Vulcans' Player of the Year.

Awards
Ben Matulino won the club's Player of the Year award. Ben Henry was named Young Player of the Year and Elijah Taylor was the clubman of the year. Konrad Hurrell was the Vodafone People's choice award winner.

References

External links
Warriors official site
Warriors 2012 season rugby league project

New Zealand Warriors seasons
New Zealand Warriors season
Warriors season